Christopher Williams (born 15 March 1972 in Mandeville) is a Jamaican track and field sprinter.

Williams is best known for winning the silver medal in the 200 metres at the 2001 World Championships. In 2001 he was named Jamaica Sportsman of the Year. Williams has competed in the Olympic Games three times, in 2000, 2004 and 2008, reaching the semi-finals of the 200m on all occasions. He was on the bronze medal-winning 4 x 400 metre relay team at the 2000 Olympics. He finished seventh in the 200m final at the 2007 World Championships.

Williams represented Jamaica at the 2008 Summer Olympics in Beijing. He competed at the 200 metres and placed third in his first round heat after Brian Dzingai and Christian Malcolm in a time of 20.53 seconds. He improved his time in the second round to 20.28 seconds and placed third again, this time after Dzingai and Walter Dix. He ran his semi final race in 20.45 seconds and placed sixth, which was not enough to make it to the Olympic final. Married to Cherylyn Williams

Achievements

See also
List of doping cases in athletics

References

External links
 
 

1972 births
Living people
Jamaican male sprinters
People from Mandeville, Jamaica
Olympic athletes of Jamaica
Olympic silver medalists for Jamaica
Commonwealth Games medallists in athletics
Athletes (track and field) at the 2000 Summer Olympics
Athletes (track and field) at the 2004 Summer Olympics
Athletes (track and field) at the 2008 Summer Olympics
Commonwealth Games gold medallists for Jamaica
Commonwealth Games bronze medallists for Jamaica
Athletes (track and field) at the 2002 Commonwealth Games
Athletes (track and field) at the 2006 Commonwealth Games
Pan American Games silver medalists for Jamaica
Athletes (track and field) at the 1999 Pan American Games
Athletes (track and field) at the 2003 Pan American Games
World Athletics Championships medalists
Doping cases in athletics
Jamaican sportspeople in doping cases
Medalists at the 2000 Summer Olympics
Olympic silver medalists in athletics (track and field)
Pan American Games medalists in athletics (track and field)
Goodwill Games medalists in athletics
Competitors at the 2001 Goodwill Games
Medalists at the 1999 Pan American Games
Medalists at the 2003 Pan American Games
Central American and Caribbean Games medalists in athletics
Central American and Caribbean Games silver medalists for Jamaica
Competitors at the 2002 Central American and Caribbean Games
Medallists at the 2002 Commonwealth Games
Medallists at the 2006 Commonwealth Games